Ryan Hall (born in the United States) is an American retired soccer player.

References

American soccer players
Living people
Association football defenders
Year of birth missing (living people)